In Greek mythology, Molus (/ˈmoʊləs/; Ancient Greek: Μῶλος Molos means "toil and moil") was the illegitimate son of Deucalion, son of Minos, king of Crete or of Minos instead.

Family 
Molus was the father, by Melphis or Euippe, of Meriones, the charioteer of Idomeneus in the Trojan War.

Apollodorus' account 
 To Deucalion were born Idomeneus and Crete and a bastard son Molus.

Hyginus' account 
Meriones, son of Molus and Melphis, from Crete, with 40 ships. [Catalogue of ships for the Trojan War]

Mythology

Diodorus Siculus' account 

 Minos’ sons, they say, were Deucalion and Molus, and to Deucalion was born Idomeneus and to Molus was born Meriones. These two joined with Agamemnon in the expedition against Ilium with ninety ships, and when they had returned in safety to their fatherland they died and were accorded a notable burial and immortal honours. And the Cretans point out their tomb at Cnosus, which bears the following inscription:
 Behold Idomeneus the Cnosian’s tomb, and by his side am I, Meriones, the son of Molus.

Death 
Molus had attempted to violate a nymph but was afterwards found without a head; for at a certain festival in Crete they showed the image of a man without a head, who was called Molus.

Notes

References 

 Apollodorus, The Library with an English Translation by Sir James George Frazer, F.B.A., F.R.S. in 2 Volumes, Cambridge, MA, Harvard University Press; London, William Heinemann Ltd. 1921. ISBN 0-674-99135-4. Online version at the Perseus Digital Library. Greek text available from the same website.
 Diodorus Siculus, The Library of History translated by Charles Henry Oldfather. Twelve volumes. Loeb Classical Library. Cambridge, Massachusetts: Harvard University Press; London: William Heinemann, Ltd. 1989. Vol. 3. Books 4.59–8. Online version at Bill Thayer's Web Site
 Diodorus Siculus, Bibliotheca Historica. Vol 1-2. Immanel Bekker. Ludwig Dindorf. Friedrich Vogel. in aedibus B. G. Teubneri. Leipzig. 1888–1890. Greek text available at the Perseus Digital Library.
 Gaius Julius Hyginus, Fabulae from The Myths of Hyginus translated and edited by Mary Grant. University of Kansas Publications in Humanistic Studies. Online version at the Topos Text Project.

Cretan characters in Greek mythology